This is a list of members of the metal band Mushroomhead. The band have undergone many lineup changes, leading every studio album to have a different lineup, with the only constant member being drummer Steve "Skinny" Felton. Their lineup currently consists of Felton, keyboardist and water drummer Rick Thomas, bassist Ryan Farrell, water drummer Robbie Godsey, vocalists Jason Popson and Steve Rauckhorst and guitarist Tommy Shaffner. Other incarnations of the band's lineup have members such as two vocalists, a turntablist, two guitarists, a rapper, a single keyboardist and/or live dancers.

Members

Current

Former

Live Musicians

Live Performers

Guest Artists
Mandy Lascko - Lead Vocals on "Mommy"
Scott Edgell - Additional Vocals on "The New Cult King" & "The Final Act"
Sean Kane - Guest Vocals on "Tattoo"
Joe Altier - Guest Vocals on "Holes In The Void"
Sarah Sloan - Guest Vocals on "Holes In The Void"
Jus Mic - Lead Vocals on "Childlike"
Jens Kidman - Vocals on "The Dream is Over"
Devon Gorman - 	"Female vocals on One More Day" & "Our Own Way"
John Sustar - Extra Percussion on "Harvest The Garden"

Mask Makers
David Greathouse - Made all masks from 2001 to 2013
Jordan Beier (Rigator) - Made the scarecrow masks for Halloween 2012
Jordan Patton - Made the prototype masks in 2014, and Scott Beck's Ventriloquist Dummy mask
Jason Kisner - Made masks from 2014 to present
Brian Demski - Made the "restraint" mask for the "Come On" video, and also made Waylon's headgear for the "Burn" video
Joe Gaal - Made Gravy's 2022 mask, and the pumpkin masks for Halloween 2022

Note: The "over masks", used by the band, were not made by any of the mask makers, they were made by different companies and the band just made molds of them and did different paint jobs. One of the masks were made from a "Masquerade Jester" face mask (found at this location). Another one was a "Demon Goat" mask (found at this location). The other masks were made from vintage face masks, probably made by Ben Cooper, inc.

Lineups

Timeline

Recording Timeline

References 

Mushroomhead